Bythinella austriaca is a species of very small freshwater snail with an operculum, an aquatic gastropod mollusk in the family Amnicolidae.

Distribution 
The distribution of this species is Carpathian (eastern alpine and Carpathian).

This species occurs in:
 Bulgaria
 Czech Republic – it lives mainly in Moravia and in eastern Bohemia, but there are also isolated populations near Prague
 Germany – lives only in Bayern and is endangered (Gefährdet)
 Poland
 Slovakia

Habitat 
Bythinella austriaca lives in springs and in brooks near springs.

References

External links

Bythinella
Gastropods described in 1857
Taxa named by Georg Ritter von Frauenfeld